Manucharyan is an Armenian patronymic surname made up of Manuchar and the Armenian -yan or -ian.

It may refer to:

 Armen Manucharyan (born 1995), Armenian footballer 
 Ashot Manucharyan (born 1954), Armenian teacher
 Edgar Manucharyan (born 1987), Armenian footballer
 Nina Manucharyan (1885-1972), Armenian film actress

See also
 Manuchehr (name) and variants Manuchar, Manuchihr, or Manouchehr (Persian: منوچهر, Manūčehr, Old Persian: Manōčihr)

Armenian-language surnames